Radical 138 or radical stopping meaning "" or "" is one of the 29 Kangxi radicals (214 radicals in total) composed of 6 strokes. In Taoist Bagua cosmology, 艮 is the seventh of eight trigrams.

In the Kangxi Dictionary, there are just five characters (out of 49,030) to be found under this radical.

 is also the 146th indexing component in the Table of Indexing Chinese Character Components predominantly adopted by Simplified Chinese dictionaries published in mainland China.

Evolution

Derived characters

Literature

External links

Unihan Database - U+826E

138
146